William Mitchell (16 March 1781 – 17 February 1854) was a Scottish entrepreneur. He was born in Alloa, Clackmannanshire, the second son of Alexander Mitchell and Janet Barrowman.

He was a co-founder of the Alloa Coal Company later run by his sons Andrew and Alexander. He was an important investor (along with other members of his family) in the Leith shipping line William Thomson and Co.; better known as the Ben Line. In the 1840s, the Ben Line was in the North Atlantic trade, taking Alloa coal to Canada and returning with timber.

Mitchell's more famous grandsons include the British civil servant in India John Ontario Miller (1857–1843), the founder of the Luscar Coal Company Colonel Alexander Mitchell (1871–1934), Sir Mitchell Mitchell-Thomson (1846–1918) a Lord Provost of Edinburgh, the Auditor-General of Tasmania Duncan Charles Mitchell (1859–1925) and the noted Scottish Humanities scholar William Mitchell Ramsay (1851–1939).

References

 George Blake, The Ben Line, Thomas Nelson and Sons Ltd; London, 1956
 John L. Carvel, One Hundred Years in Coal, T and A Constable, Edinburgh, 1944

Scottish businesspeople
1781 births
1854 deaths
People from Alloa
19th-century British businesspeople